Group Captain Horace Percy Lale  (8 April 1886 – 5 April 1955) was a Royal Air Force officer and British World War I flying ace credited with 23 victories.

First World War
Lale was commissioned a temporary second lieutenant in the Royal Flying Corps on 26 September 1916. He was appointed a flying officer in the RFC on 3 April 1917, and was appointed a flight commander with the temporary rank of captain on 10 February 1918. Lale was mentioned in despatches in March 1918.

Interwar years and Second World War
Lale remained in the Royal Air Force after the war, receiving a permanent commission in the rank of flying officer on 1 August 1919. For distinguished service in the 1919-1920 Waziristan campaign, he was awarded a bar to his DFC in July 1920. He was promoted to flight lieutenant on 1 January 1921, to squadron leader on 1 January 1924 and to wing commander on 1 January 1930. He was promoted to group captain on 1 January 1936. He served through the start of the Second World War, but retired from the RAF on 8 April 1941.

Citation for military decoration
Distinguished Flying Cross (DFC)

2nd Lieut. (A./Capt.) Horace Percy Lale. (FRANCE)

A bold and courageous officer, who leads his patrol with marked skill and judgment. He has accounted for twelve enemy aeroplanes—five crashed, four shot down in flames, and three driven down out of control. On 6 September he led his patrol of nine machines to the assistance of some formations that were attacked by thirty or forty enemy aircraft; in the engagement he and his Observer accounted for two Fokkers; eventually the enemy was driven off, five of their machines being destroyed and three shot down out of control.

References

Companions of the Distinguished Service Order
People from Nottingham
1955 deaths
Royal Air Force personnel of World War I
Royal Air Force personnel of World War II
Royal Flying Corps officers
Military personnel from Nottingham
Royal Air Force officers
1886 births
Recipients of the Distinguished Flying Cross (United Kingdom)
British World War I flying aces